The 2019 Arizona Bowl was a college football bowl game played on December 31, 2019, with kickoff at 4:30 p.m. EST (2:30 p.m. local MST) on CBS Sports Network. It was the 5th edition of the Arizona Bowl, and one of the 2019–20 bowl games concluding the 2019 FBS football season. Sponsored by the Nova Home Loans mortgage broker company, the game was officially known as the Nova Home Loans Arizona Bowl.

Teams
The game was played between the Wyoming Cowboys from the Mountain West Conference and the Georgia State Panthers from the Sun Belt Conference. This was the first time that the two programs met, and the first Arizona Bowl appearance for both programs.

Wyoming Cowboys

Wyoming entered the game with a 7–5 record (4–4 in conference), having lost three of four games to end their regular season. They finished in fourth place in Mountain West's Mountain Division. The Cowboys lost to the only ranked FBS team they faced, Boise State.

Georgia State Panthers

Georgia State also entered the game with a 7–5 record (4–4 in conference), also having lost three of four games to end their regular season. They finished in third place in the Sun Belt's East Division. The Panthers also lost to the only ranked FBS team they faced, Appalachian State.

Game summary

Statistics

References

External links

Game statistics

Arizona Bowl
Arizona Bowl
Arizona Bowl
Arizona Bowl
Georgia State Panthers football bowl games
Wyoming Cowboys football bowl games